USS Oriole may refer to:

, was a river sternwheel steamer acquired in 1864 and sold in 1865
, was the former sloop-of-war USS Dale launched in 1839, renamed Oriole in 1906 and sold in 1921
, was an  launched in 1918 and sold in 1947
, was launched as USS LCI(L)–973 in 1944, renamed Oriole in 1952 and sold in 1961
, was an  launched in 1993 and sold in 2010

United States Navy ship names